Scythemarked butterflyfish can refer to two fish species:

 Prognathodes carlhubbsi, the southern scythemarked butterflyfish.
 Prognathodes falcifer, the northern scythemarked butterflyfish.